The 75th Regiment of Foot was an infantry regiment of the British Army from 1758 to 1763.

It was formed on 28 April 1758 from the 2nd Battalion of the 37th Regiment of Foot and placed under the  command of Maj-Gen. the Honourable John Boscawen. After taking part in the capture of Belle Isle off the French coast they were redeployed to the West Indies, returning via Lisbon in 1762 for service on the Iberian Peninsula.

The regiment was disbanded in 1763.

Regimental Colonels
1758–1762: Maj-Gen. Hon. John Boscawen
1762–1763: Gen. Marisco Frederick

References

Infantry regiments of the British Army
Military units and formations established in 1758
Military units and formations disestablished in 1763
1758 establishments in England